"Hooks in You" is the first single from British rock band Marillions fifth album Seasons End, released in 1989. It was the first single to feature lead singer Steve Hogarth, who joined the band the same year, replacing Fish.

"Hooks in You" peaked at #30 on the UK Singles Chart, the highest-charting single from Seasons End and the band's twelfth consecutive top 40 hit since 1983.

7 September 1989 Marillion performed the single at the Top of the Pops.

Overview
Written as a single, "Hooks in You" is a departure from the progressive rock slant of most of Seasons End, featuring a more straightforward hard rock sound. In the liner notes of Marillion's 1992 compilation album A Singles Collection (Six of One, Half-Dozen of the Other in the US), Steve Hogarth discussed how the song came about:

The b-side featured the predominantly acoustic ballad "After Me", which would also appear as a bonus track on the CD version of Seasons End. A slightly longer version of the title track, the "Meaty Mix", is included on the 12" and CD single.

A music video was released for this single, featuring the band performing the song before a crowd at the Brixton Academy.

Track listing

7" and cassette version
Side 1
"Hooks in You" (7" mix) – 2:55
Side 2
"After Me" - 3:21

12" and CD versions
Side 1
"Hooks in You" (Meaty Mix) – 3:53
Side 2
"Hooks in You" (7" mix) – 2:55
"After Me" – 3:21

Chart positions

Personnel
Steve Hogarth – vocals
Steve Rothery – guitars
Mark Kelly – keyboards
Pete Trewavas – bass
Ian Mosley – drums

References

Marillion songs
1989 singles
1989 songs
EMI Records singles
Songs written by Steve Rothery
Songs written by Steve Hogarth
Songs written by Mark Kelly (keyboardist)
Songs written by Ian Mosley
Songs written by Pete Trewavas